Göran Nils Robert Stangertz (19 July 1944 – 27 October 2012) was a Swedish actor, director and artistic leader at Helsingborgsteatern. He won Sweden's most prestigious film award Guldbagge Award twice in the category best male leading role for his roles in Det sista äventyret ("The Last Adventure") and Spring för livet ("Run for Your Life"). From 2009 and until his death he was married to actress Kajsa Ernst.

Göran Stangertz received his theatrical education in Scenskolan and Göteborg during the years 1964-1967. His first work as an actor was in the film based on Fritiof Nilsson Piraten's novel "Bokhandlaren som slutade bada" ("The bookseller that stopped taking baths") in 1969. In 1977 he played the role of Jack in a film of one of Ulf Lundell's novels. He was participating in the humorous show "Köp mjölk, Skriv bok" ("Buy milk, write book") when he was diagnosed with cancer, and left the work not long before the premiere.

Filmography

References

External links

1944 births
2012 deaths
People from Flen Municipality
Swedish male film actors
Swedish male television actors
Swedish male stage actors
Swedish film directors
Swedish theatre directors
20th-century Swedish male actors
21st-century Swedish male actors
Deaths from cancer in Sweden
Deaths from throat cancer
Best Actor Guldbagge Award winners